Zelia Trebelli-Bettini (1836–1892) also known as Zelia Gilbert or by her stage name Trebelli, was a French operatic mezzo-soprano. Born in Paris, she died in Etretat.
Mme Trebelli's artistry was greatly admired by George Bernard Shaw, who wrote about her a number of times in his various reviews.  In particular, he admired her interpretations and her exemplary English diction, rare for a non-native English speaker.

Her daughter Antonia (originally Antoinette) Dolores Trebelli (c. 1864 – ) was a distinguished soprano, and as "Mademoiselle Dolores" was well received in Australia and New Zealand.

References

External links
Photograph of the singer, accessed 3 June 2008

Gallery

1838 births
1892 deaths
19th-century French women opera singers
French operatic mezzo-sopranos
Singers from Paris